The Honda Grand Prix of St. Petersburg was the opening round of the 2009 IndyCar Series on April 5, 2009. It was the first time in IndyCar Series history that the season begins on a road course and not an oval. The race saw 4 drivers make their debuts in the championship: Stanton Barrett, Mike Conway, Robert Doornbos and Raphael Matos. The race was contested over 100 laps of the 1.80 mile street course.

Graham Rahal started from the pole but a poor start meant that he dropped back and out of contention for the victory. Defending champion Scott Dixon crashed out on lap 80, a poor start to his defence of the title, which left Penske's Ryan Briscoe to take the chequered flag from Ryan Hunter-Reay who finished 2nd and Justin Wilson who came home 3rd.

Race 

The race exceeded road racing's traditional two-hour time limit. No reason was given for this.

Grand Prix of St. Petersburg
Honda Grand Prix of St. Petersburg
Honda Grand Prix of St. Petersburg
Honda Grand Prix of St. Petersburg
21st century in St. Petersburg, Florida